Stuart Alan Geman (born March 23, 1949) is an American mathematician, known for influential contributions to computer vision, statistics, probability theory, machine learning, and the neurosciences. He and his brother, Donald Geman, are well known for proposing the Gibbs sampler, and for the first proof of convergence of the simulated annealing algorithm.

Biography

Geman was born and raised in Chicago. He was educated at the University of Michigan (B.S., Physics, 1971), Dartmouth Medical College (MS, Neurophysiology, 1973), and the Massachusetts Institute of Technology (Ph.D, Applied Mathematics, 1977).

Since 1977, he has been a member of the faculty at Brown University, where he has worked in the Pattern Theory group, and is currently the James Manning Professor of Applied Mathematics. He has received many honors and awards, including selection as a Presidential Young Investigator and as an ISI Highly Cited researcher. He is an elected member of the International Statistical Institute, and a fellow of the Institute of Mathematical Statistics and of the American Mathematical Society. He was elected to the US National Academy of Sciences in 2011.

Work

Geman's scientific contributions span work in probabilistic and statistical approaches to artificial intelligence, Markov random fields, Markov chain Monte Carlo (MCMC) methods, nonparametric inference, random matrices, random dynamical systems, neural networks, neurophysiology, financial markets, and natural image statistics. Particularly notable works include: the development of the Gibbs sampler, proof of convergence of simulated annealing, foundational contributions to the Markov random field ("graphical model") approach to inference in vision and machine learning, and work on the compositional foundations of vision and cognition.

Notes

Members of the United States National Academy of Sciences
1949 births
Living people
20th-century American mathematicians
21st-century American mathematicians
Probability theorists
American statisticians
Fellows of the American Mathematical Society
Brown University faculty
Geisel School of Medicine alumni
University of Michigan College of Literature, Science, and the Arts alumni
Massachusetts Institute of Technology School of Science alumni